A penumbral lunar eclipse took place on Saturday, October 29, 1966, the second of two lunar eclipses in 1966. This was a deep penumbral eclipse, with over 90% within Penumbral Shadow.

Visibility

Related lunar eclipses

Lunar year series

Metonic series

Half-Saros cycle
A lunar eclipse will be preceded and followed by solar eclipses by 9 years and 5.5 days (a half saros). This lunar eclipse is related to two solar eclipses of Solar Saros 123.

See also
List of lunar eclipses
List of 20th-century lunar eclipses

Notes

External links

1966-10
1966 in science